Nat Hudson (born October 11, 1957) is a former American football guard. He played for the New Orleans Saints in 1981, the Baltimore Colts in 1982 and for the Jacksonville Bulls from 1984 to 1985.

References

1957 births
Living people
American football offensive guards
Georgia Bulldogs football players
New Orleans Saints players
Baltimore Colts players
Jacksonville Bulls players